The Peaks of Zelengora is a 1976 Yugoslav war drama directed by Zdravko Velimirović.

Plot 
During the 1943 Battle of Sutjeska, Yugoslav partisan troops must endure 24 hours of heavy attacks by German troops on the hill called Ljubin Grave.

Cast 
 Sergei Bondarchuk as Profesor
 Bata Živojinović as Boro
 Josephine Chaplin as Milena
 Alain Noury as Milan
 Veljko Mandić as Veljko
 Ljiljana Dragutinović as Čarna
 Slobodan Dimitrijević as Andrija Šiler
 Danilo Lazović as Dačo
 Faruk Begoli as Rajko
 Branko Đurić as Rajko Đurović
 Voja Mirić as Sturmbannführer
 Božidar Pavićević Longa as Hauptsturmführer
 Miodrag Krstović as Radica
 Darinka Đurašković as Anđa
 Gordana Kosanović as Borka
 Peter Carsten as Oberst
 Rastislav Jović as Hans

Credits 
 Screenplay: Zdravko Velimirović, Mladen Oljača, Đurica Labović, Aleksandar Vukotić
 Director of photography: Zoran Jovičić
 Music: Zoran Hristić
 Film editor: Katarina Stojanović
 Sound recording: Duško Aleksić
 Boom operator: Milan Tričković
 Assistant directors: Krsto Petanjek, Đorđe Vujović
 Costumes: Ljiljana Dragović
 Makeup artist: Šuco Šarkić
 Camera operator: Stevan Lepetić
 Script supervisor: Ranka Velimirović
 Assistant to the director: Milorad Laković
 Assistant camera: Nikola Đurašković, Marko Živković
 Assistant editor: Peca Aleksić
 Set dresser: Asim Babić
 Gaffer: Boško Kovačević
 Special effects: Islam Ibračić, Vlatko Miličević
 Set construction: Lelo Adil
 Armourer: Stojan Mrba
 Wardrobe: Zvonimir Meštrović, Ramiza Kalamujić
 Props: Mirsad Huković
 Figurines: Vera Jovičić
 Unit menager: Simo Cvjetković
 Production menagers: Slobodan Roganović, Savo Popović, Maric Perić

Rewards 
 Golden Arena for Best Screenplay 1976: Zdravko Velimirović, Mladen Oljača, Đurica Labović and Aleksandar Vukotić.
 Golden Arena for Best Supporting Actor 1976: Veljko Mandić.

Dedication 
This film is dedicated to the defenders of Ljuba's grave during the fateful battle of Sutjeska.

Special thanks 
 Military consultant Maj. General Milan Vukotić. "The Production thanks the Yugoslavian People's Army for their collaboration during this film."

See also 
 Battle of Sutjeska

References

External links 
 
 67. Pulski filmski festival

Films set in 1943
Films directed by Zdravko Velimirović
Yugoslav war drama films
1976 films
1976 drama films
Partisan films
War films set in Partisan Yugoslavia
Films set in Bosnia and Herzegovina
1970s war drama films
Yugoslav World War II films